Toumany Kouyate is a singer, composer and Kora player. He plays authentic traditional music from Senegal which was derived from the griot tradition, where cultural history is kept alive through music and dance passed down from generation to generation. Kouyate comes from a long line of artists and musicians, his instrument of choice is the kora,  a 21-string bridge-harp used extensively in West Africa.

Personal life 
Kouyate was born in Senegal, but currently resides in Las Vegas, Nevada.

Shows and performances 
Kouyate performs nightly for the "O" (Cirque Du Soleil) at the Bellagio Hotel and Casino which is located on the Las Vegas Strip.

He has also performed in many other festivals and concerts around the world including the Afrikadey Festiva], and also the Festival International Les Étoiles Nuits d'Afrique (Toumany Kouyaté & Zal Idrissa Sissokho).

Albums credited for working on 

Journey of a Man
The Forest (Toumany Kouyate) by Cirque Du Soleil
Cirque du Soleil: "O" [Soundtrack]

References

External links 
 Toumany Kouyate Facebook profile
 All Music
 Album Credits
 Artist Direct

Living people
Senegalese musicians
Year of birth missing (living people)